Formula Rolon, also known as Formula Rolon Chevrolet and later Formula Rolon 2010 is an open wheel single seater Formula Racing car made and raced in India. They run in the single make championships held in the tracks of Coimbatore and Chennai. The car is similar to Formula Asia, and was powered by 1600cc  Chevrolet and later Suzuki engines with a racing gear box.  The car was launched in Mumbai December 2005 and made its debut in Coimbatore track in September 2006. The 2010 season was its last season as LG Sports announced that it will not enter Formula Rolon for the 2011 season.

Name
The name Rolon is the brand name of automotive chains and sprockets, owned by L.G.Balakrishnan Brothers Ltd. Coimbatore. They are the also the main sponsor and parent company of Super Speeds.

Design
The car is built around a monocoque steel space frame and the body panels are of Composite Fire retardant GRP. Aerodynamic aides include adjustable front wing, and adjustable Flower type rear wing. The Racing Tyres are from JK tyres and the cars have a choice of grooved semi-slick and  ungrooved slick version on the Race day.

The car was entirely designed and constructed by Coimbatore-based Super Speeds, the same company that designed the Formula Maruti in the mid 80's, which is now a division of L.G.Balakrishnan and Brothers. The Chief designer of the car is ex-racing driver B.Vijaykumar and aided by his team of engineers and designers. The car has a high indigenous content of over 97%.

Formula Rolon Chevrolet
The Formula Rolon Chevrolet (2006–2009) cars were powered by a Chevrolet 1.6 liter engine during the years 2006 till 2009 and the car was known as Formula Rolon Chevrolet, as supplied by General Motors India for a three-year contract. Over 18 cars were manufactured of which 15 were supplied to various teams while three chassis were retained for development activities.

Formula Rolon 2010
For the 2010 season Super Speeds launched a short wheelbase version and equipped with the in house race tuned 1.3 liter Suzuki engine with a race tuned EFI. The 2010 model was simply known as Formula Rolon 2010. The short wheelbase has a new exterior design and the car was made 100 kg lighter than the earlier model to improve the power to weight ratio.

Engine and Gearbox

Chevrolet 1600 engines
The 1.6 liter engine was supplied by General Motors India for the Formula Rolon Chevrolet versions during the years 2006 till 2009.  The Chevrolet 1600 cc engine produced  in race trim as of 2006 with a re-chipped ECU; otherwise it was the same stock engine as used in Chevrolet Optra model sold in India. Notable race modifications from the passenger car engine include a re-chipped ECU supplied by GM India, K&N Air filter and tuned Free flow Exhaust pipes while the Head, Block and Camshaft remained the same as in Stock.This was also a first for Chevrolet’s involvement in Racing outside United States.

Super Speeds Suzuki 1300 engines
For 2010 season, the short wheelbase version was called Formula Rolon 2010 and used a 1300cc 16 valve engines from Suzuki Swift. The 1.3 liter Suzuki engines had modified cylinder heads, race tuned free flow exhausts and high lift cam shafts modified  to race specifications producing over 40% more power than the factory stock versions. The engine management systems were supplied by Race Dynamics of Bangalore with a programmable Fuel Injection system.

The Gearbox was a Racing gear box, with straight cut-dog ring gears and in-built LSD (Limited Slip Differential) manufactured in-house at Coimbatore by Super Speeds similar to Hewland racing transmission.

Tyres
JK tyres of India makes and supplies the tyres specially designed for this car. JK Tyres also sponsor the National championship and few drivers in this series. The tyres are available in Wet and Slicks.

Costs
The drivers racing budget for a 12 race (6 Double races) annual season was costing one tenth compared to a full season in or Formula Asia in other South East Asian countries or Formula Ford in UK in 2006. This series was considered to be the best way to select racers for the Formula Asia and Formula BMW series and was a stepping stone for graduating into higher series of international single seater racing championships.

Championship races
The cars were built for LG Sports, to run in the JK National Road racing championship, which is the breeding ground for young racers in India.

The Cars are sold with the Engine on lease or the complete car leased with three different springs supplied per car. All engines are sealed by LG Sports with the maintenance of the engine by Super Speeds.

The class in which the car races is a single make championship class, with the cars sold or leased to several teams, who in turn engage or hire drivers. The races are annual championship series held in Kari Motor Speedway in Chettipalayam, Coimbatore and in MMSC track in Irungattukottai in Chennai. The Drivers with most points accumulated from his wins and finishing positions becomes the Formula Rolon Chevrolet champion for the respective year.

Teams
 NK racing – Narain Karthikeyan’s  team with Speed Petrol (Bharat Petroleum) as Team Sponsors.
Gemini Racing - Chennai - Akkineni Anand Prasad's scholarship based ace driver outfit 
Mars racings – Chennai
Meco Racing – Chennai
Rams Racing – Chennai
Prime Racing – Coimbatore
Red Rooster Racing – Bangalore/Chennai
 Team Amaron Pro Racing with MECO
 VA Racing – Chennai

Drivers and tuners
Notable drivers who have taken part in the series and still involved include ex-Formula 3 champion Akbar Ibhrahim, ex-karting champion Ameya Walavalkar, Asia-Pacific Rally winner Gaurav Gill, ex-Formula Maruti champion Gaurav Dalal, 2005 Formula LGB Champion Reo Banajee, 2006 Formula LGB Swift national champion Saran Vikram Tmars, Aswin Sunder and 2009 Formula Maruti champion Vikash Anand.

Champions

See also
Formula Maruti
Formula LGB Swift
Formula LGB Hyundai
JK Tyre National Racing Championship

External links
General Motors India Site
Donuts in Formula Rolon by Ameya Walawanker-VIDEO
BS Motoring Article
Article from The Hindu
GM Insider News
My Chevrolet Article on Formula Rolon Chevrolet
More Pictures

Rolon
Rolon
Indian racing cars
One-make series
Auto racing series in India